Catoptria permiacus is a species of moth in the family Crambidae described by Wilhelm Petersen in 1924. It is found in Poland, the Baltic region, Finland, European Russia, the Russian Far East (Amur, Ussuri), China (Manchuria, Sichuan), Korea and Japan.

The wingspan is 20 about mm.

References

Moths described in 1924
Crambini
Moths of Europe
Moths of Asia